Barun Burman (born 5 November 1954) is an Indian former first-class cricketer who represented Bengal from 1972 to 1986. He was a right-arm fast-medium bowler, regarded as "probably the fastest bowler Bengal has ever produced". After retirement, he became a coach and then a selector.

Life and career
Born on 5 November 1954 in Calcutta, Burman made his first-class debut at the age of 17 playing for AN Ghosh XI in the Moin-ud-Dowlah Gold Cup Tournament. He went on to appear in 54 first-class and 11 List A matches, representing Bengal, East Zone, Rest of India and BCCI Board President's XI. He came close to national team selection having been named in the probables list on a few tours, but never made it to the Indian squad. He finished his career with 146 first-class wickets at an average of 29.36.

Burman became a cricket coach after retirement. He started a cricket academy in Kolkata in 2004 called "Barun Burman Cricket Academy" where he organized coaching camps for age-group cricketers. Later the name was changed to "Aditya Barun Burman Academy". He also worked for the Cricket Association of Bengal as a selector on its senior and junior selection committees. He was appointed the chief of junior selection committee in 2008.

References

External links 
 
 

1954 births
Living people
Indian cricketers
Bengal cricketers
East Zone cricketers
Indian cricket coaches
Cricketers from Kolkata